The Workers' Party of Belgium (PTB; , PVDA) is a Marxist and socialist political party in Belgium. It is one of the few Belgian parties that is a fully national party, representing both Flanders and Wallonia.
Having traditionally been a small party, the PTB-PVDA has gained momentum since the 2010s, continuously scoring better at the polls and elections, particularly in Wallonia and working-class communities in Brussels.

History 

The Workers' Party of Belgium originated in the student movement at the end of the 1960s. Students (organized in the student union SVB - Studenten VakBeweging), mainly from the Catholic University of Leuven, turned towards the working-class movement. They considered the politics of the existing Communist Party of Belgium revisionist, i.e. too much turned toward social-democratic politics (represented in Belgium by the Belgian Socialist Party). They were influenced by the ideas of the Communist Party of China, guerrilla movements in Latin America, the movement against the Vietnam War, and the Leuven-Vlaams movement, all perceived as aspects of a worldwide struggle against colonial or neo-colonial oppression and for civil or workers' rights.

Their support and participation in an important strike in the coalmines turned the movement into a political party. They founded a periodical, AMADA (Alle Macht Aan De Arbeiders - All Power To The Workers), which became the first name of their party. In 1979 the first congress was held, which adopted a Maoist programme and changed the name into PVDA-PTB. Ludo Martens became the first president, and remained an important ideologist of the party until his death in 2011.

The PTB-PVDA used to host the International Communist Seminar until 2014 which had become one of the main worldwide gatherings of communist parties.

Recent developments 

Following its electoral defeat in 2003, the PVDA-PTB fundamentally changed its working methods and communication. On one hand, the PVDA-PTB said it would refocus on working with factory workers as well as on field work in the communities where it operates. On the other hand, the PVDA-PTB said it would officially break with what it calls its sectarian past to get closer to the concrete demands of citizens. This is reflected particularly by the demands put forward on very concrete issues, e.g. lower prices for medication, the reduction of VAT on energy products from 21% to 6%, an increase of the minimum pension, better control of rents or the lower cost of trash bags.

In preparation for the Belgian elections of June 2007, the Solidarity newspaper and the website of the party were merged in order to reach a wider public. The structures have also been "open" to a broader layer of activists.

On 2 March 2008, the work of the Eighth Congress of the PVDA-PTB was completed with a closing meeting at the Vrije Universiteit Brussel. This Congress was conducted with the theme of "party renewal." A new Central Committee was elected, which in turn elected a new Bureau of the Party. It consists of:

 Peter Mertens, b. 1969. President
 Lydia Neufcourt, b. 1955. Responsible for expanding the party
 Raoul Hedebouw, b. 1977. National voice of the PVDA-PTB
 Joris Van Gorp, b. 1952. Head of union relations
 Jo Cottenier, b. 1947. Responsible for the socio-economic issues
 Baudouin Deckers, b.1946. Head of International Relations.
 Tom De Meester, b. 1975. Energy.
 David Pestieau, b. 1969. Editor of Solidarity.

This 'shift' seems to have produced some positive results, such as an increase in membership and a rebound of the electoral score of the PVDA-PTB in recent elections. The last elections in May 2019 showed more progress: a breakthrough was realised at the Flemish and European level. Since 2018 the party is also represented in the municipal councils of larger cities in Flanders, Wallonia and Brussels.

In September 2014 the party had more than 8,000 members, in 2020 the number had grown to 20,000. Its monthly publication "Solidaire / Solidair" has between 3,000 and 5,000 subscribers. COMAC, its youth movement, is active in all the universities in Belgium and in secondary schools (in Flanders, Wallonia and Brussels). The PVDA-PTB is also known for its 11 Medicine for the people medical centres, which provide free access to primary health care.The newspaper Solidarity, and Medicine for the People'' organize "ManiFiesta", a yearly festival of solidarity between the communities and the left in Belgium. The first edition was held in Bredene (by the sea) on 25 September 2010 and brought together 6,000 people from both North and South of Belgium. The fourth edition in 2013 attracted 10,000 people.

Ideology and positions 

The party is a radical left, Marxist and anti-capitalist party, and has been labeled as populist and far-left. The party is the most left-wing party represented in the Belgian Federal Parliament.

The party advocates for strengthening workers' rights, increasing pensions, and decreasing the retirement age to 65, and supports expanding social programs and the welfare state. It supports increasing taxes on the wealthy and corporations. It is opposed to austerity and neoliberalism.

A central part of the party's program is the "social climate revolution", which seeks to combat both climate change and social inequality. 

Although the party is in favor of greater ecological policies, the party has been nicknamed the "Party of the Automobile", for its opposition to restrictions on individual car use, including opposing low emissions zones in Antwerp city center, paid parking in Schaerbeek, and increased fines for illegal parking in Liège. Despite this, the party also advocates for expanding public transit and making public transit free.

2022 Russian invasion of Ukraine 
The party abstained from the vote condemning the 2022 Russian invasion of Ukraine in the Chamber of Representatives. According to PTB MP Nabil Boukili, "the diplomatic way is the only possible way to avoid a war". Party spokesman Raoul Hedebouw said he condemns the invasion of Ukraine but does not think NATO should be part of the solution.

Historical 
Historically the party supported Marxism–Leninism.

Electoral results
The general elections of 2007 saw the party obtaining 0.88% in the Flemish electoral district and 0.81% in Wallonia.

In the regional elections in 2009 the PVDA-PTB gained 1.04% of the vote in Flanders (+0.48%) and 1.24% of the vote in Wallonia (+0.62%). For the European elections on the same day the results were: 0.98% in the Dutch-speaking electoral college (+0.37%) and 1.16% in the French-speaking electoral college (+0.35%).

In the general elections of June 2010 the party saw further growth. In Flanders it now represents 1.3% (+0.4%) of the votes for the Chamber of Representatives and 1.4% (+0.5%) for the Senate. Especially in the cities progress was noted with high scores in Antwerp (4.1%) and Liège (4.2%). The highest scores were gained in the cantons of Herstal (9.8%), Assenede (7.5%) and Seraing (7.3%); all places where the PVDA-PTB traditionally is strong.

The municipal and provincial elections in 2012 were considered a breakthrough on a local level for the PVDA-PTB. The party won 52 seats in total; 31 in municipal councils, 4 in provincial councils, and 17 in the district councils.

The federal and regional elections in 2014 saw further success for the party. They elected two deputies to the Chamber of Representatives, two others to the Walloon Parliament, and finally four to the Brussels Parliament.

An opinion poll released in July 2017 suggested the party was the most popular party in Wallonia at the time, with 25% of respondents indicating they intended to vote for the party. The second-most popular party was the Mouvement Réformateur, part of the governing coalition, with 23%. The poll indicated that the Workers' Party would win 26 seats in the Belgian Chamber of Representatives if the next federal election were held immediately, putting it in tied first place with the Flemish N-VA.

The party generally increased its vote share in the 2018 local elections, and won over 15% of the vote in several French-speaking cities.

In the 2019 Belgian federal election, the party scored well and gained 10 seats. The party did well in Wallonia (13.8% overall there), scoring over 16% in Liège Province, over 15% in Hainaut Province, and also over 12% in Brussels-Capital Region. It achieved at least 22% of the votes in both Charleroi and La Louvière cities. Its strongest showing in Flanders was 12.71% in Antwerp city, while in Wallonia, it's strongest showing was in Herstal with 27.55% of the votes. The PTB was also the fourth largest party in the European election the same day in the Francophone areas, winning 14.59% and giving it one seat.

Chamber of Representatives

Senate

Regional

Brussels Parliament

Flemish Parliament

Walloon Parliament

European Parliament

Elected politicians
European deputies
 2019 – 2024:
Marc Botenga

Federal deputies
 2019 – 2024:
Nabil Boukili
Gaby Colebunders
Roberto D'Amico
Greet Daems
Steven De Vuyst
Raoul Hedebouw
Sofie Merckx	
Peter Mertens
Nadia Moscufo	
Marco Van Hees
Maria Vindevoghel
Thierry Warmoes

Regional deputies
 2019 – 2024:
Brussels
Jan Busselen
Francis Dagrin
Caroline De Bock
Françoise De Smedt
Elisa Groppi
Youssef Handichi
Jean-Pierre Kerckhofs
Stéphanie Koplowicz	
Leila Lahssaini	
Petya Obolensky
Luc Vancauwenberghe

Flanders
Jos D'Haese
Tom De Meester
Kim De Witte
Lise Vandecasteele

Wallonia
Alice Bernard
John Beugnies
Jori Dupont
Antoine Hermant
Laure Lekane
Julien Liradelfo	
Germain Mugemangango
Samuel Nemes
Amandine Pavet
Anouk Vandevoorde

Provincial councilors 
 2018 – 2024:
  Catharina Craen
  Giovanni Dell'Area
  Marc Delrez
  Catherine Lacomble
  Luc Navet
  Rafik Rassâa
  Marie-Christine Scheen
  Rudy Sohier
  Luc Vandenameele
  Patricia Van Muylder

References

External links

 
Statuts du PTB (French)

1979 establishments in Belgium
Anti-capitalist political parties
Marxist parties
Political parties established in 1979
International Meeting of Communist and Workers Parties
Socialism in Belgium